Barakula is a rural locality in the Western Downs Region, Queensland, Australia. In the  Barakula had a population of 13 people.

Barakula's postcode is 4413.

History 
In 1911 the Queensland Railway Department built a tramway from Chinchilla to Wongongera (now Barakula) to transport railway sleepers made from logs taken from the state forest at Barakula and milled at the Barakula sawmill (approx ). The route of the Barakula tramway was based on an earlier plan to construct a railway line from Chinchilla to Taroom that was subsequently abandoned in favour of a railway line from Miles to Taroom. Originally established to supply sleepers for the Great Western Railway, the sawmill and the tramway operated intermittently depending on demand. The sawmill was mothballed in August 1928 but a caretaker, F. Brooks, was retained. The line reopened in 1942.  The tramway operated until 1970. It was a  gauge tramway.

Wongongera Sawmill Provisional School opened on 25 July 1912. In 1914 it was renamed Barakula Provisional School. It closed and re-opened a number of times due to low student numbers. In 1927 it became Barakula State School. It closed on 31 December 1982. It was located within Barakula State Forest (approximately ).

In the  Barakula had a population of 13 people.

Heritage listings 
Barakula has the following heritage-listed sites:
 Barakula State Forest: Waaje Fire Tower No.4

References

Further reading 

 

Western Downs Region
Localities in Queensland